
Year 1552 (MDLII) was a leap year starting on Friday (link will display the full calendar) of the Julian calendar.

Events

January–June 
 January 15 – Henry II of France and Maurice, Elector of Saxony, sign the Treaty of Chambord.
 February 12 – Pedro de Valdivia founds the Chilean city of Valdivia, as Santa María la Blanca de Valdivia.
 February 24 – The privileges of the Hanseatic League are abolished in England.
 March – The Act of Uniformity imposes the Protestant Book of Common Prayer on England.
 March 26 – Guru Amar Das becomes the Third Sikh Guru.
 April – War breaks out between Henry II of France and Emperor Charles V. Henry invades the Duchy of Lorraine, and captures Toul, Metz and Verdun.
 April 11 – Metz Cathedral is consecrated.
 April 16 – Pedro de Valdivia founds the city of La Imperial, Chile. 
 May – Maurice, Elector of Saxony, captures Augsburg, and almost seizes Charles V, Holy Roman Emperor at Innsbruck, leading to the suspension of the Council of Trent.

July–December 
 July 6–July 9 – In Hungary, Drégely Castle is attacked by the Ottoman Empire. Captain György Szondy and c. 140 soldiers in the castle die, after 4 days of fighting against 8,000 Turkish raiders.
 August 2 
 John Frederick, Elector of Saxony and Philipp I of Hesse, taken prisoner by Charles V in 1546, are released.
 The Peace of Passau revokes the Augsburg Interim of 1548, and promises religious freedom to the Protestant princes.
 September – In Hungary, captain István Dobó commands the breaking of the Siege of Eger, led by Kara Ahmed Pasha of the Ottoman Empire.
 September 24 – The Debatable Lands on the border of England and Scotland are divided between the two kingdoms by a commission creating the Scots' Dike in an unsuccessful attempt to halt lawlessness here, but giving both countries their modern borders.
 October 2 – The Khanate of Kazan falls to troops of Ivan IV of Russia.

Date unknown 
 In the Persian Gulf, the Ottoman Empire Red Sea Fleet attacks the Portuguese stronghold of Hormuz, but fails to capture it. 
 The Ottoman's capture the city of Temesvar.
 In Italy, Bartolomeo Eustachi completes his Tabulae anatomicae, presenting his discoveries on the structure of the inner ear and heart, although, for fear of the Inquisition, it will not be published until 1714.
 King Edward VI of England founds 35 grammar schools by royal charter, including Shrewsbury; Leeds Grammar School is also established.

Births 

 January 14 – Alberico Gentili, Italian jurist (d. 1608)
 January 22 – Walter Raleigh, English explorer (d. 1618)
 February 1 – Edward Coke, English colonial entrepreneur and jurist (d. 1634)
 February 8 – Agrippa d'Aubigné, French poet and soldier (d. 1630)
 February 19 – Melchior Klesl, Austrian statesman and cardinal (d. 1630)
 February 20 – Sengoku Hidehisa, Japanese daimyō (d. 1614)
 February 25 – Magdalene of Lippe, Countess of Lippe by birth, and by marriage Landgravine of Hesse-Darmstadt (d. 1587)
 February 28 – Joost Bürgi, Swiss clockmaker and mathematician (d. 1632)
 March 1 – Anna of Cleves, Duchess of Jülich-Cleves-Berg by birth and by marriage Countess Palatine of Neuburg (d. 1632)
 March 18 – Polykarp Leyser the Elder, German theologian (d. 1610)
 March 20 – Christoph, Count of Hohenzollern-Haigerloch (d. 1592)
 April 20 – Frederick IV of Liegnitz, German noble (d. 1596)
 May 8 – Petrus Ryff, Swiss scientist (d. 1629)
 May 12 – Edmund Bowyer, English politician (d. 1627)
 June 2 – Raja Wodeyar I, King of Mysore (d. 1617)
 June 8 – Gabriello Chiabrera, Italian poet (d. 1638)
 June 17 – John George of Ohlau, Duke of Oława and Wołów (1586-1592) (d. 1592)
 June 29 – Elizabeth Spencer, Baroness Hunsdon, English baroness (d. 1618)
 July 18 – Rudolf II, Holy Roman Emperor (d. 1612)
 July 22
 Anthony Browne, Sheriff of Surrey and Kent (d. 1592)
 Mary Wriothesley, Countess of Southampton, Lady of English peer and others (d. 1607)
 August 14 – Paolo Sarpi, Italian writer (d. 1623)
 August 21 – Muhammad Qadiri, Founder of the Naushahia branch of the Qadri order (d. 1654)
 August 24 – Lavinia Fontana, Italian painter (d. 1614)
 September 12 – Andreas Schott, Flemish academic, linguist, translator, editor and a Jesuit priest (d. 1629)
 September 20 – Lorenz Scholz von Rosenau, German botanist (d. 1599)
 September 21 – Barbara Longhi, Italian painter (d. 1638)
 September 22 – Tsar Vasili IV of Russia (d. 1612)
 September 27 – Flaminio Scala, Italian playwright and stage actor (d. 1624)
 October 6 – Matteo Ricci, Italian Jesuit missionary to China (d. 1610)
 October 11 – Tsarevich Dmitry Ivanovich of Russia, Grand Prince of Moscow (d. 1553)
 October 18 
Elisabeth of Saxony, Countess Palatine of Simmern (d. 1590)
Francis Cherry, English diplomat (d. 1605)
 October 23 – Odet de Turnèbe, French dramatist (d. 1581)
 October 28 – Simón de Rojas, Spanish saint (d. 1624)
 December 18 – Ahmad Ibn al-Qadi, Moroccan writer, judge and mathematician (d. 1616)
 November 20 – Gilbert Talbot, 7th Earl of Shrewsbury, English politician and Earl (d. 1616)
 November 26 – Seonjo of Joseon, King of Joseon (d. 1608)
 December 27 – William Cavendish, 1st Earl of Devonshire, English politician and Earl (d. 1626)
 December 29 – Henri I de Bourbon, prince de Condé (d. 1588)
 December 31 – Simon Forman, English occultist and astrologer (d. 1611)
 Date unknown:
 Hans von Aachen, German mannerist painter (d. 1615)
 Thomas Aufield, English Catholic martyr (d. 1585)
 Jean Bertaut, French poet (d. 1611)
 Philemon Holland, English translator (d. 1637)
 Prince Masahito, Japanese prince (d. 1586)
 Lady Saigō, Japanese concubine (d. 1589)
 Dom Justo Takayama, Japanese daimyo (d. 1615)
 Anthony Tyrrell, Roman Catholic renegade priest and spy (d. circa 1610)
 Jean Hotman, Marquis de Villers-St-Paul, French diplomat (d. 1636)
 Cvijeta Zuzorić, Croatian poet (d. 1648)
 probable
 Miguel de Benavides, Spanish clergyman and sinologist (d. 1605)
 Francisco Goméz de Sandoval y Rojas, Duke of Lerma, Spanish politician (d. 1625)

Deaths 

 January 3 – Henry of the Palatinate, bishop of Utrecht (b. 1487)
 January 10 – Johann Cochlaeus, German humanist and controversialist (b. 1479)
 January 22 – Edward Seymour, 1st Duke of Somerset, English politician (b. 1509)
 February 6 – Henry V, Duke of Mecklenburg (b. 1479)
 February 20 – Anne Parr, Countess of Pembroke, English countess (b. 1515)
 February 26 – Heinrich Faber, German composer (b. 1500)
 March 29 – Guru Angad, Indian religious leader (b. 1504)
 April 19 – Olaus Petri, Swedish clergyman (b. 1493)
 April 18 – John Leland, English historian (b. 1502)
 April 21 – Petrus Apianus, German astronomer (b. 1495)
 May 26 – Sebastian Münster, German cartographer and cosmographer (b. 1488)
 June 10 – Alexander Barclay, British poet (b. 1476)
 July 9 – György Szondy, Hungarian soldier
 August 15 – Hermann of Wied, German Catholic archbishop (b. 1477)
 September 23 – Barbara of Brandenburg-Ansbach-Kulmbach, Landgravine of Leuchtenberg (b. 1495)
 October 14 – Oswald Myconius, Swiss Protestant reformer (b. 1488)
 October 17 – Andreas Osiander, German Protestant theologian (b. 1498)
 November 10 – Günther XL, Count of Schwarzburg (b. 1499)
 December 3 – Francis Xavier, Spanish Jesuit missionary and saint (b. 1506)
 December 20 – Katharina von Bora, wife of Martin Luther (b. 1499)

References